Transfluthrin is a fast-acting pyrethroid insecticide with low persistency.  It has the molecular formula C15H12Cl2F4O2.

Transfluthrin can be used in the indoor environment against flies, mosquitoes, moths and cockroaches. It is a relatively volatile substance and acts as a contact and inhalation agent.

Transfluthrin, if used contrary to product instructions, may cause symptoms of poisoning including nervousness, anxiety, tremor, convulsions, skin allergies, sneezing, running nose and irritation. Treatment depends on symptoms. No specific antidotes are known, but antihistamines may help to control any allergies.

In experiments, transfluthrin was shown to kill 85 percent of mosquitos within one hour of exposure at concentrations below 0.3 µg/m3 (which was the detection limit) in air. (The data suggests that transfluthrin is effective at these concentrations within much less than an hour of exposure.)

Various household transfluthrin products such as vaporizers and mosquito coils may result in concentrations of 15 µg/m3 to 40 µg/m3. In the EU, the acceptable exposure level (AEL) for humans is 500 µg/m3.

See also
 Metofluthrin
 Tefluthrin

References

External links
 
 

(2,3,5,6-tetrafluorophenyl)methyl 3-ethenyl-2,2-dimethylcyclopropane-1-carboxylates
Organochlorides